WZXZ-CD, virtual channel 36 (UHF digital channel 20), is a low-powered, Class A television station licensed to Orlando, Florida, United States. The station is owned by the L4 Media Group.

History
The station originally signed on as an affiliate of The Box. Following The Box's acquisition by Viacom in 2001, it began carrying programming from MTV2. In 2005, Viacom sold WZXZ to L4 Media Group.

From 2004 to late summer of 2006, WZXZ carried the Spanish music video channel Mas Musica, now known as MTV Tr3́s. However, when Mas Musica became MTV Tr3́s, WZXZ resumed simulcast of MTV2 for a short period of time, rather than picking up MTV Tr3́s, for unknown reasons.

For some part of later 2006, it had shown a repeated loop of a religious infomercial. This was the last actual programming shown on the channel. For most of 2007, the station was broadcasting nothing but the screensaver from a DVD player, accompanied by an outdated severe weather warning crawl across the screen.

Most recently, sometime around the start of January 2008, the station was transmitting a color bar test pattern with call letters displayed via CHARGEN overlay. This is presumably due to no station ID being displayed per FCC requirements for some time (aside from when the EAS-triggered warnings would occasionally be scrolled).

As of September 2008, the station started airing Caribevision, a Spanish television network based out of Miami and New York City. On August 13, 2012, WZXZ-CA began broadcasting América Tevé programming after America CV folded. The station switched to Soul of the South Network in 2014.

On August 12, 2014, L4 Media Group reached a deal to sell WZXZ-CA to OTA Broadcasting, a company controlled by Michael Dell's MSD Capital; the deal was not filed with the Federal Communications Commission (FCC) until November.

The station was licensed for digital operation on May 26, 2015, changing its call sign to WZXZ-CD.

References

External links

ZXZ-CD
Television channels and stations established in 1989
Low-power television stations in the United States
YTA TV affiliates